Podturn (in older sources also Podturen) is a small settlement to the south of Trebelno in the Municipality of Mokronog-Trebelno in southeastern Slovenia. The area is part of the historical region of Lower Carniola. The municipality is now included in the Southeast Slovenia Statistical Region.

References

External links

Podturn on Geopedia

Populated places in the Municipality of Mokronog-Trebelno